A Roberts linkage is a four-bar linkage which converts a rotational motion to approximate straight-line motion.

The linkage was developed by Richard Roberts.

The Roberts linkage can be classified as:
 Watt-type linkage
 Grashof rocker-rocker
 Symmetrical four-bar linkage

References

See also
Straight line mechanism
Four-bar linkage

Linkages (mechanical)
Straight line mechanisms